is a Japanese footballer currently playing as a defender for Iwate Grulla Morioka.

Career statistics

Club
.

Notes

References

1999 births
Living people
Association football people from Chiba Prefecture
Nippon Sport Science University alumni
Japanese footballers
Association football defenders
J2 League players
JEF United Chiba players
Iwate Grulla Morioka players